Wadsworth is a village in Lake County, Illinois, United States. Per the 2020 census, the population was 3,517. It is named after E. S. Wadsworth, who was a major stockholder for the Chicago, Milwaukee, St. Paul and Pacific Railroad, which passes through the village.

Geography

Major streets
  Tri-State Tollway
 Old US-41
 Russell Road
 Kilbourne Road
 Delany Road
  Skokie Highway
  Rosecrans Road
 21st Street
 Wadsworth Road
 Cashmore Road
  Green Bay Road
 Dilleys Road

Demographics

2020 census

Note: the US Census treats Hispanic/Latino as an ethnic category. This table excludes Latinos from the racial categories and assigns them to a separate category. Hispanics/Latinos can be of any race.

2000 Census
As of the census of 2000, there were 3,083 people, 1,036 households, and 886 families residing in the village. The racial makeup of the village was 94.13% White, 1.72% African American, 0.13% Native American, 1.04% Asian, 1.04% from other races, and 1.95% from two or more races. Hispanic or Latino of any race were 3.54% of the population.

There were 1,036 households, out of which 39.3% had children under the age of 18 living with them, 78.9% were married couples living together, 4.0% had a female householder with no husband present, and 14.4% were non-families. 11.5% of all households were made up of individuals, and 4.8% had someone living alone who was 65 years of age or older. The average household size was 2.98 and the average family size was 3.24.

In the village, the population was spread out, with 27.8% under the age of 18, 6.0% from 18 to 24, 27.8% from 25 to 44, 30.3% from 45 to 64, and 8.2% who were 65 years of age or older. The median age was 40 years. For every 100 females, there were 101.9 males. For every 100 females age 18 and over, there were 101.1 males.

The median income for a household in the village was $86,867, and the median income for a family was $92,060. Males had a median income of $60,893 versus $36,399 for females. The per capita income for the village was $45,171. About 1.2% of families and 1.8% of the population were below the poverty line, including 1.3% of those under age 18 and 1.9% of those age 65 or over.

Wadsworth is home to the Tempel Farms Lipizzan Horses.

Wadsworth also contains the pyramid house. "The largest 24-karat gold-plated object ever created" is the private home of Jim Onan, a wealthy Armenian garage builder, and his family.  The Onans occasionally open the house for tours of the  6-story structure containing a replica of King Tut's tomb. The walled property also features a triple-pyramid garage, a  statue of Ramesses II, and a recreation of King Tutankhamun's tomb. In 2018, the pyramid house was severely damaged by fire.

References

External links

 Village of Wadsworth official website

Villages in Illinois
Villages in Lake County, Illinois